West Virginia Route 892 is a north–south state highway located in Wood County, West Virginia. The southern terminus of the route is at West Virginia Route 68 south of Lubeck. The northern terminus is at U.S. Route 50 and WV 68 north of Lubeck.

The route is a large loop route, connecting the Ohio River community of Washington to WV 68.

Major intersections

References

892
Transportation in Wood County, West Virginia